Maximilian "Max" Mauff (born 3 July 1987) is a German actor.

Life and career 
Mauff started acting in the child theatre. Later he had first roles in short movies by Aelrun Goette. In 2002 he had his first leading role as Tristan in Kai Wessel's The Year of the First Kiss. In the following years he took roles in various German TV and film productions.

In 2015, Mauff had a recurring role in the American series Sense8. In the same year, he starred in the single-take German drama film, Victoria.

Partial filmography 

1995: Besame Mucho (Short)
1999: Zug der Wünsche (Short)
2002: The Year of the First Kiss (Das Jahr der ersten Küsse) - Tristan (jung)
2004: Peas at 5:30 (Erbsen auf halb 6) - Ben
2005: Kombat Sechzehn - Philip Sander
2005: Measures to Better the World (Weltverbesserungsmaßnahmen) - David Krüger (segment "Aktive Krankenversicherung")
2005: Was ich von ihr weiß - Tom
2008: The Wave (Die Welle) - Kevin
2008: Absurdistan - Temelko
2008: Berlin Calling - Zivi Alex
2008: The Reader - Rudolf
2009: Locked - Chris
2009: Men in the City (Männerherzen) - Tobi
2009: Mensch Kotschie - Mario Kotschie
2012: Diaz – Don't Clean Up This Blood - Karl
2012: Eine königliche Affäre - Das riskante Leben des Leibarztes Johann Friedrich Struensee - König Christian VII von Dänemark und Norwegen
2012: Closed Season (Ende der Schonzeit) - Bruno
2013:  (Hannas Reise) - Carsten
2014: Stromberg - Der Film - Jonas
2014: Patong Girl - Felix Schröder
2015: Victoria - Fuß
2015: Bridge of Spies - Ott's Secretary
2015: Homeland (TV Series) - Gregor
2015-2018: Sense8 (TV Series, 9 episodes) - Felix Berner
2015: Weinberg (TV Mini-Series) - Kirk
2016: Jonathan - Lasse
2016:  - Micha
2016: Schweinskopf al dente - Verkäufer
2016: Conni & Co. - Pfleger
2016: Strawberry Bubblegums - Ronnie
2017: Die Unsichtbaren - Cioma Schönhaus
2018: Safari: Match Me If You Can - David
2019: Cleo - Zille
2019: A Hidden Life - Sterz
2020: MaPa (TV Mini-Series) - Metin

References

External links 

 

1987 births
Living people
German male film actors
German male television actors
German male stage actors
20th-century German male actors
21st-century German male actors
Male actors from Berlin